The T-Mk 6 Fanfare is a towed sonar decoy developed after the Second World War by the United States Navy.  It replaced the Foxer noisemaker.  It was more effective than the Foxer, producing a sound similar to a ship's propeller, rather than wideband noise.

External links
 https://web.archive.org/web/20060222070937/http://www.de220.com/Armament/Decoys/Decoys.htm 
 https://web.archive.org/web/20060213013431/http://www.de220.com/Mysteries/Mysteries.htm 

Sonar decoys
Weapons countermeasures